Craig Donald Wallace (born 27 June 1990) is a Scottish cricketer.  Wallace is a right-handed batsman who fields as a wicket-keeper. He was born in Dundee and was educated at the High School of Dundee.

Wallace made his debut for Scotland in a List A match against Hampshire at the Rose Bowl in the 2011 Clydesdale Bank 40.  Scotland toured Namibia in September 2011, despite not featuring in Scotland's first-class Intercontinental Cup match against Namibia, he did feature in the two List A matches which proceeded that match. He also made his Twenty20 debut on the tour against the hosts, making four appearances.  He was selected as part of Scotland's squad for the World Twenty20 Qualifier.

In June 2019, he was selected to represent Scotland A in their tour to Ireland to play the Ireland Wolves. In July 2019, he was selected to play for the Edinburgh Rocks in the inaugural edition of the Euro T20 Slam cricket tournament. However, the following month the tournament was cancelled.

In September 2019, he was named in Scotland's squad for the 2019 ICC T20 World Cup Qualifier tournament in the United Arab Emirates. In September 2021, Wallace was named in Scotland's provisional squad for the 2021 ICC Men's T20 World Cup.

References

External links

1990 births
Living people
Scottish cricketers
Scotland One Day International cricketers
Scotland Twenty20 International cricketers
Cricketers from Dundee
People educated at the High School of Dundee
Leeds/Bradford MCCU cricketers
Wicket-keepers